Maritime was a rugby league club in Auckland. They competed from 1918 to 1930 under the name Maritime for 4 seasons, Athletic for 4 seasons, Grafton Athletic for 3 seasons and Kingsland Athletic (following a merger with Kingsland Rovers) for 2 seasons, before the club was 'forced' to join with Marist Old Boys in 1931.

Club History

Formation and first season
On 10 April 1918 the “Maritime Club” applied to the Auckland Rugby League for affiliation to the league. They were nominating a senior team and their application was granted. They also nominated T. Sullivan as their delegate which was also approved while their registration of club colours was “held over for one week” due to another club applying to use the same colours. Their club colours eventually settled on red, white, and blue. Their first match was against Newton Rangers at Victoria Park, Auckland on April 27. Their first ever senior squad was listed as “A Cross, Campney, Dufty, Lynne, Barchard, Haddon, Brett, Kingi, Hira, Welson, Williams, Lunn, Doran, Hemming, Stallworthy, Wheeler, Newdick, Hunt, Martin, and Avery”. They were defeated 23 points to 9 with their points being scored by Pitman (try), and Dufty (3 goals). They played 2 further practice matches before the season officially got under way on May 18. They put up a good showing in their first ever official match and only lost to City Rovers 15–13 on Victoria Park with an estimated crowd of 5,000. They struggled at times during the season but competed well in many matches. They finished with only 1 win from 9 matches and that victory was a win by default over the North Shore Albions who soon after withdrew from the competition owing to the war decimating playing numbers. Maritime had issues themselves with playing numbers and withdrew their junior team from the competition early in the year due to a “lack of players”.

Maritime did put up a strong showing in the Roope Rooster competition however when they defeated Grafton Athletic 16–11, and then Newton Rangers 13–8 to make the final. In the final played at the Auckland Domain in front of 7,000 spectators they were defeated by City Rovers 6–3. During the season they had their first ever Auckland representative in George Davidson when he turned out for them against Canterbury on September 14 at the Auckland Domain before a crowd of 10,000. He scored a spectacular 5 tries in a 45–9 win. Davidson was a champion sprinter and competed for New Zealand at the 1920 Antwerp Olympics coming 5th in the 200m final.

Sadly during the first season their club secretary, Charles Albert Brett died of influenza on November 21, 1918, aged just 29. At their annual meeting at the League club rooms on Swanson Street at the start of 1919 it was reported that as a result of his death the club was unable to complete a very thorough report on their inaugural season. At the meeting Mr. C. Liversidge presided. Their original officers from 1918 were not reported in the newspapers however their elected officers for the 1919 season were:- Patron, Mr. P. Virtue; president, Mr. C. Liversidge; vice-presidents, Hon. Arthur Myers, Hon. T. Wilford, Messrs W. Evans, Jack Endean, Captain Fox, Dingley, C. Weaver, H. McLeod, R. Bromwich, W. Ryan, W. Meredith, J. Brasier, W. Morrow, Foreman E. Davis, T.R. Baillie, Jim Gleeson, T. Hayes, C. Seagar, W. Ah Chee, M. Saunders; secretary and treasurer, William James Liversidge; committee, Messrs. Sutton, Sheenan, Bert Avery, Lynee, Stallworthy, George Davidson, Roberts, Mitchell, Brady; delegate to the league, Mr. E. Stallworthy; hon. Auditors, Messrs. Ivan and N. Culpan. They had also secured the playing services of future New Zealand captain, Bert Avery who had returned from the war. Avery and John Lang were to become Maritime's first New Zealand representative players when they debuted for them against Australia on August 23.

1919 to 1921 as Maritime and lone title
Maritime's next 3 years saw them perform very well in the A grade competition known as the Myers Cup at the time. In 1919 they finished 3rd out of 8 teams with a 5-2-1 record finishing just 1 point behind Ponsonby United. They drew their round 9 match with North Shore Albions and their round 10 match with Ponsonby when a win would have won them the title. They once again made the Roope Rooster final, losing to Newton Rangers 8–5 in the final. George Davidson led the competition in tries scored with 14 and points scored with 64. The 1919 season was also notable as they played a benefit match against City to raise money for Opai Asher who had been injured in an accident. They also went on a three match tour which was very unusual for a club side to do in this era. They played Petane at McLean Park in Napier, and Ahuriri on the same ground on October 9 and 11 respectively. They won the matches 32-0 and 37–3. They then played Taradale and beat the local side 31–3 on October 15. They also played Richmond Rovers in Thames in a series of matches on October 18 though the results were not reported. During the 1919 season the Post & Telegraph Football Club decided to merge with the Maritime club.

1920 saw Maritime win their one and only first grade title (Monteith Shield) when they finished the season with a 9 win and 2 loss record ahead of City Rovers 2 points back. For the third year in a row they lost the Roope Rooster final by 12 points to 6 against Newton Rangers. Eric Grey who had joined Maritime in 1919 represented New Zealand during the season in two test matches against the touring England side. While Ernie Herring who had joined in 1920 also represented New Zealand in one test match against the English side. Jim O'Brien who would also go on to represent New Zealand in one test match against Queensland in 1925 also was in his debut senior season after returning from World War 1 the previous year aged 23. He transferred to the Devonport United club the following season.

1921 was another good year for Maritime though they could only manage runner up in the Monteith Shield and remarkably managed to lose the Roope Rooster final for the 4th straight time. They had earlier beaten Marist 10–8 in round 1 though the league ordered the match replayed after Marist complained that the referee had blown the game off before time was up. Maritime won the replay 21-10 and then the semi final 12–7 over Fire Brigade. Maritime's loss in the final came at the hands of City Rovers 30–14. During the season Maritime made history when they were the first team to ever play on Carlaw Park on June 25 alongside City Rovers. They lost the match 10–8. Future New Zealand representative Ivan Littlewood had joined the side and finished second in the try scoring lists with 12 tries for the season. They were also joined for the 1921 and 1922 season by Australian professional boxer Mike Flynn who spent a large amount of time in the early 1920s in New Zealand and later joined the City Rovers in 1923.

1922-1925 Name change to ‘Athletic’
At the start of the 1922 season Maritime changed their name to ‘Athletic’ and changed their club colours from red, white, and blue to royal blue with a gold band across the chest. It was said at their annual meeting that they had 130 registered players and had entered six teams in the previous season. They could only manage 6th place in the 8 team competition with a 6 win, 8 loss record and astonishingly lost the Roope Rooster final for the 5th consecutive year, this time losing to Ponsonby United by a single point, 11–10.

They had gained the services of New Zealand international Craddock Dufty in 1922 and he was to remain with the club until the end of the 1926 season. He led the competition in points scored in 1923 with 59 points. Going into the final round of the 1923 season Athletic had a 2-point lead over City Rovers in the Monteith Shield but lost to them 11-8 thus forcing a final to be played a week later. Athletic continued their miserable record in finals by losing 8–7 at Carlaw Park in front of 11,500 spectators.

The 1924 season saw Athletic come 4th of 9 teams with an 8 win, 2 draw, 5 loss record. Bill Te Whata had joined the club in July. In August he played for New Zealand against the touring England side in the first test along with Maritime teammate Craddock Dufty. Thus they became  the club's fifth and sixth New Zealand representatives whilst members. Dufty had of course made his New Zealand debut in 1919. Joe Hadley was the leading try scorer in the senior competitions with 12, while Craddock Dufty top scored once again with 91 points. In 1925 Athletic could only manage 6th in a 7 team competition, winning just 4 matches from 12 games. Wilson Hall who had joined Athletic in 1923 became the 7th New Zealand representative at Athletic when he played 5 matches on the tour of Australia and another against the touring Queensland side. Len Mason had also spent the 1924 and 1925 seasons at the club but did not represent New Zealand until the following season when he had move to Christchurch.

1926-1927 Name change to Grafton Athletic
The start of the 1926 season saw Athletic change their name to Grafton Athletic. The name Grafton was the suburb immediately south of the location of Carlaw Park. The name change did not change their fortunes and they finished last, only winning 2 matches out of 13. They were not helped when towards the end of the season Bert Avery and Ernie Herring departed for England to play for New Zealand on their tour there. Avery was chosen as the New Zealand captain for the tour while Herring ended up playing 30 matches, the most of any of the tourists.

In 1927 they fared even worse losing all 12 matches and finishing last once again. As a result, they were forced to play a promotion/relegation match with Ellerslie United. They lost 11-3 and were demoted to the B Division for the 1928 season.

In 1928 in the B Division (Norton Cup) they won the competition going undefeated with a 10 win, 2 draw record. They also made the Stallard Cup knockout final but lost to Point Chevalier 15–13 in the final. Their championship win earned them the right to play off with Ellerslie United (who had finished last in the Monteith Shield). Grafton again lost the match however by 13 points to 11 meaning they would remain in the B division.

1929-1930 Amalgamation with Kingsland Rovers
 Rather than remain in the B Division again Grafton Athletic decided to amalgamate with the Kingsland Rovers club and apply to enter a team in the Monteith Shield competition. A combined meeting was held in early April with 80 members in attendance with the new club name to be Kingsland Athletic Football Club. They decided to change their club colours to be a maroon jersey with a blue and gold shield and a “K.A.” monogram. Their first committee as a combined club “was: Patron, Mr. W.J. Webb; vice-patrons, Messrs. Bartram E. Barnaby and Pratt; president, Mr. J. McQuillan; vice presidents same as last year with power to add; hon. Secretary, Mr. J.R. Angelo, Messrs. Bert Avery and T. Ratcliffe, delegate to Auckland Rugby League, Mr. H. Catterall; delegate to junior management committee, Mr. W. Dryland; club captain, Mr. John McGregor; committee, Messrs. Floray (chairman). H. Neil, A. Brown, L. Lucas, A. Huxford, J. Carter, Scott, Newman, and Opie”. Their admission into the first grade competition was granted at an April 17 meeting of the Auckland Rugby League.

The new team featured Kingsland Rovers player Claude List who had represented New Zealand. They were coached by Bert Avery and finished the 1929 season with a 5 win, 1 draw, 8 loss record to finish 6th out of 8 teams. In 1930 they fared similarly winning 4, drawing 1 and losing 8 and once again finished 6th of 8.

Joining Marist Old Boys
The 1931 season saw Auckland Rugby League seeking to make the first grade competition more competitive. There had been a feeling that there were too many teams and the crowd number had dropped accordingly. The decision to drop from 8 teams to 6 had been made at the conclusion of the 1930 season. Kingsland Athletic had been removed from the A Grade and with a new reserve grade competition forming would have been forced into a Senior B grade which would have essentially been a 3rd division in terms of playing quality. As a result, they sought permission to join with the much stronger Marist Old Boys. They were “informed that the league would not opposed such a move”. And thus the Kingsland Athletic Football Club which had started out as Maritime Football Club in 1918 was no more. Players, R Carter, Herring, Claude List and a handful of others moved to the Marist club while others were given free transfers to any other club.

Season records

Myers Cup/Monteith Shield (first grade championship)

Norton Cup (B Division)

Roope Rooster (knock out competition)

Stallard Cup (B Division knock out competition)

Representative players

New Zealand players (with appearances whilst members of the Maritime club)

 Bert Avery 1919-27 (53)
 John Lang 1919 (2)
 Eric Grey 1920 (2)
 Ernie Herring 1920-27 (37)
 Bill Te Whata 1924 (1)
 Craddock Dufty 1924-26 (32)
 Wilson Hall 1925 (6)

Auckland players (with appearances whilst members of the Maritime club)

 George Davidson 1918-19 (6)
 A Sutton 1919 (1)
 Bert Avery 1919-26 (17)
 George Yardley 1919-23 (6)
 Cargill 1919 (1)
 A Cross 1919 (1)
 J Brien 1920 (1)
 Eric Grey 1920-22 (7)
 Mike Flynn 1921-22 (7)
 John Lang 1921 (4)
 Ivan Littlewood 1921 (1)
 John McGregor 1921 (2)
 N Ballantyne 1921 (1)
 Craddock Dufty 1922-26 (13)
 C Webb 1922-23 (3)
 Jack McGregor 1922-23 (3)
 Wilson Hall 1923 (3)
 Ernie Herring 1924-26 (3)
 Bill Te Whata 1925 (1)
 Len Mason 1925 (1)
 George Raynor 1926 (1)
 Claude List 1929-30 (4)
 R Carter 1929-30 (4)

Other
 Jim O'Brien Maritime: 1920-21, New Zealand: 1925, Auckland: 1923-27 (21), North Island 1927 (1)

Club titles

First grade side
 1920 Monteith Shield (First grade champions)
 1928 Norton Cup (B division champions)

Lower grades
 1918 Fourth grade champions (this was the Post & Telegraph club who became affiliated with Maritime in 1919)
 1922 Sixth grade B champions
 1923 Sixth grade B champions
 1924 Sixth grade A champions
 1926 Third grade open champions, and Second grade knockout competition winners
 1927 Third grade open knockout competition winners
 1930 Third grade intermediate champions

Top point scorers and try scorers (1918-1930)
The point scoring lists are compiled from matches played in the first grade championship, Roope Rooster, Phelan Shield and Stormont Shield matches which involved all first grade sides. It does not include additional one off type matches such as those against non-Auckland teams or charity matches. It also does not include points in the B Division.

References

Auckland rugby league clubs
1918 establishments in New Zealand
1931 disestablishments in New Zealand
Rugby clubs established in 1918
Sports clubs disestablished in 1931